The Comical Gallant is a 1701 comedy play by the English writer John Dennis. Also known by the longer title The Comical Gallant: Or the Amours of Sir John Falstaffe, it is a reworking of Shakespeare's play The Merry Wives of Windsor. The epilogue was written by William Burnaby.

References

Bibliography
 Burling, William J. A Checklist of New Plays and Entertainments on the London Stage, 1700-1737. Fairleigh Dickinson Univ Press, 1992.

1701 plays
English plays
Comedy plays
West End plays
Plays by John Dennis